Agent in Place is the seventh novel by Mark Greaney, published on February 20, 2018 by Berkley Books. It is also the seventh book in the Gray Man series. The novel puts its main character Court Gentry at the forefront of the civil war in Syria, as he helps a group of expatriates take down the Syrian president's brutal regime. The book debuted at number 7 at The New York Times bestseller list.

Plot summary 
Two months after his CIA operation in Hong Kong, freelance mercenary Court Gentry is hired for a contract job in Paris by a group of Syrian exiles through former French intelligence officer Vincent Voland. His job is to kidnap Bianca Medina, a Spanish fashion model and Syrian President Ahmed al-Azzam's mistress, and then deliver her to the exiles so that they can gather information from her about a secret meeting between President Azzam and the Supreme Leader of Iran, in which she was present. They believe that the revelation of Azzam's secret talks with the Iranians, in which he permitted them to build military bases in Syria, would anger the Russians, who were his allies in the civil war, for betrayal; this would then cause discord among the three parties and lead to the destabilization of Azzam's regime.

Later that night, Court captures Medina from her private apartment, while also rescuing her from assassins sent by ISIS in the process. After delivering her to the FSEU, led by husband and wife doctors Tarek and Rima Halaby, he berates them for giving him faulty information about the attackers and then leaves them, finished with his job. The attackers were found out to be provided information on Medina's whereabouts (albeit presented as her being a concubine of the emir of Kuwait, who was an enemy of ISIS) by Azzam's powerful wife Shakira, who wanted the Spanish model dead after finding out about their affair and fearing that she might replace her one day as first lady of Syria.

The Halabys try to secure Medina's cooperation, but their plan becomes complicated as Bianca reveals that she gave birth to a child with Azzam, who was named Jamal after his father. She further insists that she would rather go back to war-torn Syria and care for her child rather than betray Azzam. Medina was later kept in a secluded safehouse owned by French domestic intelligence (DGSI) as suggested by Voland.

Desperate to earn her cooperation, the Halabys try to retask Gentry with another job: spirit away Medina's infant son from Syria in what is considered a suicide mission, which Court initially refuses. He later rescues the Halabys from being tortured for Medina's whereabouts by two French police officers sent by Swiss bank consultant & Shakira's right-hand man Sebastian Drexler. Court then agrees to rescue Medina's son as well as his babysitter, named Yasmin, from Damascus after she allows him to do so.

Meanwhile, Shakira sends Drexler to Paris in order to find and eliminate Medina; however, this coincides with a rescue mission for Medina that President Azzam assigned for him. Upon arriving in Paris under a stolen identity (since he was wanted by the Interpol, and Voland in particular, for his crimes as a former field operative), he plans to leave the Azzams after fulfilling the operations by faking his death. Drexler then forces French police captain Henri Sauvage to continue working for him in hunting down Medina after his colleagues had been killed by Gentry and Drexler's henchmen working for Syrian intelligence (Mukhabarat), led by Malik.

Court secures a job inside Syria as a mercenary for a German-based private military company working with pro-regime army Desert Hawks Brigade, which will provide his cover as he works on rescuing Medina's son. He then arrives at the city of Latakia, and takes part in a convoy of Mukhabarat officials which, after surviving an ambush by local al Qaeda outfit Al Nusra Front, proceeds to the capital of Damascus. Since communication devices were not allowed in the military camp where he was staying, Court later steals a phone from an Arab soldier on a night out with his fellow contractors in order to contact Medina, instigating a barfight in the process. After she gives him the location of her house, he infiltrates her home and then extracts Jamal and Yasmin amidst gunfire from pursuing Syrian forces.

Meanwhile, Sauvage identifies the location of the FSEU safehouse where Medina is being kept, which he relays to Drexler as well as Malik and his men. They infiltrate the estate, making Voland surrender himself to them and killing Tarek in the process. Rima manages to let Medina escape and then sets fire to the house; she was also killed. As Drexler and his henchmen leave the burning building, Sauvage and Malik find Medina running away and then capture her.

Court calls Voland and informs him of the successful extraction, but the French intelligence officer tells him about what had happened in the safehouse. Gentry becomes livid, but later offers to assassinate President Azzam in an effort to salvage the failed operation. Voland agrees to let Gentry be his agent in place in Syria, as long as he arranges for the extraction of Jamal and Yasmin out of the country. Court then lets Jamal and Yasmin stay in the home of Syrian doctor Shawkat Saddiqi, who is a friend of the Halabys.

Court maintains his cover as a mercenary. Amidst clearing a ruined refinery with his fellow contractors, Court gathers information about President Azzam's upcoming trip to a Russian military base in Palmyra from a Desert Hawks battalion command post stationed there. Afterwards, Court tries to alert the nearby enemy to his team's presence in order to use the impending gunfight as a diversion to contact Voland about the intel. However, he was captured by a Special Forces unit in the ensuing firefight.

Meanwhile, Drexler, Sauvage, Medina, and Malik and his men arrive in Athens, Greece to smuggle themselves back to Syria. As they prepare to board the ship for Damascus, Drexler tries to carry out his plan, which is to kill his companions and then escape the Mukhabarat operatives who were waiting for them. However, his plan goes awry when Sauvage shoots him, knocking him unconscious; still, the French police officer was also killed by the Swiss. Meanwhile, Voland, who had tracked the group to the Greek port, rescues Medina from the firefight. Drexler is then left to be rescued by the Syrian operatives waiting in the ship bound for Syria.

After identifying himself to his captors as an American with military experience, Court manages to call his boss in the CIA, Matthew Hanley, to authorize his assassination of President Azzam. By the time that the Syrian president visited the Russian military base, he manages to shoot Azzam in the face with a sniper rifle from a mile away. However, the Syrian president was whisked out of the line of fire; Court and his Syrian interpreter Abdul escape from pursuing Russian forces, but they were captured by ISIS fighters.

The next day, Court and Abdul, as well as other prisoners, were brought to a lake to be executed one by one by their captors. When it became his turn to be executed, Court manages to break free and then kills his executioners, while Abdul and the other prisoners disable their guards. Court and Abdul were then rescued by the Special Forces unit, who tell them that Azzam had died from his gunshot wound.

Meanwhile, Jamal and Yasmin had been extracted into Jordan, where they were reunited with Medina. After Azzam's death, Shakira was forced into exile in Switzerland, helped by Drexler, who had escaped death when her husband was killed, and his employer bank. Months later, Voland tracks the two down and sends Court to assassinate them. He kills Shakira; however, Drexler manages to escape even though he was wounded. After the operation, Gentry returns to the CIA for a new one.

Characters 
 Courtland "Court" Gentry: The Gray Man, code name Violator — freelance assassin
 Ahmed al-Azzam: President of Syria
 Jamal al-Azzam: Late father of Ahmed al-Azzam, former president of Syria
 Shakira al-Azzam: First lady of Syria
 Bianca Medina: Spanish fashion model, mistress of Ahmed al-Azzam
 Dr. Tarek Halaby: Cardiac surgeon, co-director of the Free Syria Exile Union, husband of Rima Halaby
 Dr. Rima Halaby: Cardiac surgeon, co-director of the Free Syria Exile Union, wife of Tarek Halaby
 Vincent Voland: Former intelligence officer, DGSE, Directorate-General for External Security (French Foreign Intelligence Service), and DGSI, Directorate-General for Internal Security (French Domestic Intelligence Service)
 Sebastian Drexler: (Code name: Eric) Swiss intelligence officer, employee of Meier Privatbank
 Henri Sauvage: Captain, Police Judiciare, French National Police
 Allard: Lieutenant, Police Judiciare, French National Police
 Foss: Lieutenant, Police Judiciare, French National Police
 Clement: Lieutenant, Police Judiciare, French National Police
 Malik: Foreign Intelligence operative of GIS, General Intelligence Service, Syrian External Security Division
 Lars Klossner: Owner of Klossner Welt Ausbildungs GMBH, security and private military contractor
 Van Wyk: KWA, private military contractor/team leader
 Saunders: KWA, private military contractor
 Broz: KWA, private military contractor
 Walid: Major in Desert Hawks Brigade (pro-regime Syrian militia)
 Paul Boyer: Former French Foreign Legionnaire, private security officer
 Robert “Robby” Anderson: Captain, U.S. Army 10th Special Forces Group
 Stefan Meier: Vice president, Meier Privatbank
 Jamal Medina: Infant son of Bianca Medina
 Yasmin Samara: Nanny to Jamal Medina
 Dr. Shawkat Saddiqi: Trauma surgeon, Syrian resistance sympathizer
 Abdul Basset Rahal: Syrian resistance fighter with the Free Syrian Army
 Matthew Hanley: Director, National Clandestine Service, Central Intelligence Agency

Development 
The book had a working title of Weaponized, and was originally centered on Court Gentry trying to stop the transport of sarin gas into Syria. But Greaney said: “That was already going on, and I just felt like by the time this book comes out, the Syrian government gassing their people was going to have been going on for years. Once I changed that, ‘Weaponized’ no longer meant anything to the story.” The title Agent in Place was suggested by his editor Tom Colgan, who thought fit the story, since the term refers to an operative who has penetrated into an intelligence target, which is Gentry’s role in the novel.

The author researched for the novel on location in Paris, France and did some research on the Syrian Civil War. Greaney points out that Agent in Place is different from previous Gray Man novels: “Court’s motivations are different this time out. He has new allies and new enemies, and you’ll meet some new characters you can expect to see in later installments.” He furthermore stated, “It’s a spy novel and an action novel, but at its core, it’s a story about valor and vengeance, and the perseverance of the human spirit despite the horrors of war.”

Reception

Commercial 
Agent in Place debuted at number 7 at the Combined Print & E-Book Fiction category of the New York Times bestseller list during the week of March 11, 2018, making it Greaney's second top 10 novel in the Gray Man series after Gunmetal Gray. It was also at number 10 at the Hardcover Fiction category of the same list, and also debuted at number 7 at the USA Today bestseller list during the week of March 1, 2018.

Critical 
The book received positive reviews. In a starred review, Publishers Weekly praised it as a "can't miss", citing "Greaney’s steady escalation of the risks that Court faces, and the exceedingly clever ways he tackles them." Kirkus Reviews stated that "Readers of the great Tom Clancy will salivate over this fast-moving and well-plotted yarn, which is part of a consistently appealing series in which each assignment is billed as the most dangerous ever." In a featured review, prominent literary reviewer The Real Book Spy hailed its main character, Court Gentry, as "represent[ing] the future of the thriller genre", and remarked: "Greaney once again develops his character brilliantly as he continues to slowly break away from the pack as the apparent heir to the throne currently held by Brad Thor and Daniel Silva."

References 

The Gray Man
2018 American novels
American thriller novels
Berkley Books books